The Westbury Formation is a geological formation in England, one of the Penarth Group. It dates back to the Rhaetian.  The formation is named after the village of Westbury-on-Severn in Gloucestershire. The remains of giant shastasaurids are known from the formation.

Vertebrate fauna
Avalonianus
Picrodon
Shastasauridae indet.

See also
 List of dinosaur-bearing rock formations

References

Triassic System of Europe
Rhaetian Stage
Geologic formations of England